The 2000 All-Ireland Senior Ladies' Football Championship Final was the 27th All-Ireland Final and the deciding match of the 2000 All-Ireland Senior Ladies' Football Championship, an inter-county ladies' Gaelic football tournament for the top teams in Ireland.

Mayo led by three points at the break and won by a point in the end, Cora Staunton leading the scoring with 2:2.

References

!
All-Ireland Senior Ladies' Football Championship Finals
All-Ireland
Mayo county ladies' football team matches
Waterford county ladies' football team matches